San Pedro de Macorís is a city and municipality (municipio) in the Dominican Republic and the capital of the San Pedro de Macorís province in the east region of the country; it is among the 10 largest cities of the Dominican Republic. The city has approximately 195,000 inhabitants, when including the metro area. As a provincial capital, it houses the Universidad Central del Este university.

Name
The name San Pedro came before that of Macorís. There are three versions regarding the origin of the name: the first attributes it to the fact that there is a San Pedro Beach in the city port; the second sees it as a tribute to General Pedro Santana, who was president at the time; and the third simply said it was in order to distinguish it from San Francisco de Macorís, a city in the north.

San Pedro de Macorís has been poetically referred to as "Macorís of the Sea", "The Sultana of the East" and many call it the "Capital of the East".

History
The city was established in 1822 on the western margin of the Higuamo River as a result of the immigration of settlers from the eastern part of Santo Domingo. In the year 1846, at the request of the inhabitants of the place called Macorix, the Conservative Council decided to declare the place as a military post. At that time, Macoris belonged to the province of Seybo, being made up of three communes: Seybo as the head municipality, Higüey and Samaná.

After 1840, the inhabitants moved from the western margin of the Higuamo to the eastern margin, where the city of San Pedro de Macorís was born, becoming one of the most productive cities of the Dominican Republic. The population was gradually increasing, dedicating itself to the production of provisions, and the quantities that reached the port of the capital in the boats of Macoris in the years 1868 to 1875, which were baptized there to the old fishermen's abode, were so great. the name of Macoris de los Plátanos.

In 1852 Macorix is elevated to military port, this time depending on the common Hato Mayor, being Norman Maldonado his first commander in arms. In 1957 the constitutional mayorship was established and its first mayor was Juan María Pinto. On October 1, 1856, the first Catholic church was founded by Father Pedro Carrasco Capeller, a native of San José de los Llanos, who came to officiate Mass from Hato Mayor. The name San Pedro de Macoris was born in 1858 at the suggestion of the presbytery Elías González, who suggested placing Macorís first, "San Pedro" and removing the x so that San Pedro de Macorís would sound, with its patron saint, Pedro Pedro. This is where the patron saint festivities are born, starting on June 22 and ending on the 29th of the same month

San Pedro de Macoris experienced a significant wave of migration in the late 19th century from Cubans who were fleeing their country's War of Independence. They brought their extensive sugar cane farming knowledge and contributed to making the sugar industry the most important economic activity in the area. San Pedro de Macorís reached its peak during the first quarter of the 20th century, when its sugar production enjoyed high prices on the international market as a result of the First World War. Many Europeans also settled in the city, making it a very cosmopolitan urban center. Pan American flew its seaplanes in regularly (Eastern Macorís has the privilege of being the first Dominican city to receive seaplanes, in its Higuamo River), at a time when this port enjoyed more commercial activity than the capital city of Santo Domingo. The next economic boom resulted in the recruitment of a large number of Afro-Caribbean workers from the Lesser Antilles. These workers and their descendants would soon comprise the majority of the population in the city and are known as the "Cocolos of San Pedro de Macoris."

San Pedro de Macorís pioneered many areas such as the first firefighting corps, the first national baseball championship, the first town to have telephone and telegraph centers, the first racetrack and the first boxing coliseum, among others. The first sugar factory was founded by Juan Amechazurra, milling for the first time on January 9, 1879. By 1894 there were many factories in the province that reached a high level of progress. The rapid industrial development placed the young city among the main ones of the Republic. The intellectual culture surged at the same pace with schools and the press; among the first newspapers were "Las Novedades", "Boletín", "La Locomotora" and "El Cable."

Culture
Some of the distinguished poets from San Pedro de Macorís include René del Risco, Pedro Mir, who held the title of National Poet; Esterbina Matos, Ludín Lugo, Juan Brayan and Mateo Robinson, among others.

In regards to drinks, Macorís produces the "Guavaberry", a drink based on the araijan fruit, which is consumed during Christmas and has a sweet taste, not unlike a wine. It is frequently consumed in rum as an infusion. Although the species grew in Hispaniola already its use was introduced and spread by immigrants from the Eastern Caribbean where colonists had discovered it as a substitute for myrtleberry-infused schnapps.

The people of San Pedro de Macorís also enjoy gathering in the Malecon, an avenue for drinking and enjoying music.

Climate
San Pedro de Macorís has a tropical savanna climate (Köppen Aw) with consistently hot temperatures and a dry season from January to March.

Sports
The city is home to the Estrellas Orientales in the Dominican Winter Baseball League, who play at the Estadio Tetelo Vargas.

San Pedro de Macoris is well known as the birthplace of a large number of professional baseball players. The Dominican capital of Santo Domingo has had 106 MLB players compared to San Pedro's 99, but Santo Domingo's population is more than ten times that of San Pedro. The city is often referred to as "The Cradle of Shortstops."

When immigrants were brought in as contract labor for sugar plantations from the Eastern Caribbean they brought the sport of cricket. They formed teams and played against each other. The ownership and management of many of the sugar estates were American. The cricket teams were offered money by their players plantation managers to switch sports and they did. Native Dominicans picked up the game watching teams composed of Eastern Caribbeans. Over time, Vic Power established an extremely good youth system in San Pedro de Macoris and was one of the largest influences on making this city into the largest source of baseball talent in the world.
Notable Major League Baseball players from the town include:

 Manny Acta
 Joaquín Andújar
 Rafael Batista
 George Bell
 Daniel Cabrera
 Robinson Canó
 Héctor Carrasco
 Rico Carty
 Juan Castillo
 Luis Castillo
 Jesús Colomé
 Johnny Cueto

 Mariano Duncan
 Tony Fernández
 Pepe Frías
 Damaso Garcia
 Domingo Germán
 Pedro González
 Pedro Guerrero
 José Jiménez
 Manny Jiménez
 Manuel Lee
 Josías Manzanillo
 Guillermo Mota

 José Offerman
 Alexi Ogando
 Jorge Polanco
 Rafael Ramírez
 Ben Rivera
 Juan Samuel
 Miguel Sanó
 Dennis Santana
 Julio Santana
 Alfonso Soriano
 Sammy Sosa
 Raimel Tapia

 Fernando Tatís
 Fernando Tatis Jr.
 Salomón Torres
 José Valverde

Other notable people
Bienvenido Fabián, composer
Luis Flores, professional basketball player, 2009 top scorer in the Israel Basketball Premier League
Sonia Silvestre, singer
Algenis Perez Soto, actor
Norberto James Rawlings, poet

Transport
San Pedro de Macoris is served by one airline with commercial flights at Cueva Las Maravillas Airport.

See also
San Pedro de Macorís Province
List of cities in the Dominican Republic
History of the Dominican Republic

References

External links
 Universidad Central del Este website
 Fundacion San Pedro de Macoris website

 
Populated places in San Pedro de Macorís Province
Municipalities of the Dominican Republic